The Museum of Buddhist Art is a museum in Suan Luang District, Bangkok, Thailand.

External links
Thai Oasis - Museum of Buddhist Art (includes information on opening times and rules)

Museums in Bangkok
Art museums and galleries in Thailand
Buddhist museums